Margaret Strickland may refer to:

Margaret Strickland (judge) (born 1980), Judge of the United States District Court for the District of New Mexico
Margaret Strickland (writer) (c. 1880–1970), English writer
Margaret, Lady Strickland, DBE, (1867–1950), English aristocrat